Columbiana High School is a public high school in Columbiana, Ohio, United States.  It is the only high school in the Columbiana Exempted Village School District. Athletic teams compete as the Columbiana Clippers in the Ohio High School Athletic Association as a member of the Eastern Ohio Athletic Conference.

History
For 50 years, the city of Columbiana was served by various one-room schoolhouses. School District Number Two had been organized as a special district in 1861 and completed the first contemporary CHS in the fall of 1864, on Pittsburgh Street.  A second building to this campus was completed in 1873, but shut down 10 years later in favor of additions. The first class graduated in 1881 with two students.

A new facility was built in 1909 adjacent from the former. An addition, including an auditorium and gymnasium, was accomplished in 1923. In 1955, the primary school was spun off into its own building, with a junior high building following in 1962. In 1998, the now Columbiana Exempted Village School District secured funding to begin the construction for a new Columbiana High School, which was constructed beside South Side Middle School on Columbiana-Waterford Road. The new CHS opened in the fall of 2000.

Academics
According to the National Center for Education Statistics, in 2019, the school reported an enrollment of 310 pupils in grades 9th through 12th, with 85 pupils eligible for a federal free or reduced-price lunch. The school employed 21.01 teachers, yielding a student–teacher ratio of 14.75.

Columbiana High School offers courses in the traditional American curriculum.

Entering their third and fourth years, students can elect to attend the Columbiana County Career and Technical Center in Lisbon as either a part time student, taking core courses at CHS, while taking career or technical education at the career center, or as a full time student instead. Students may choose to take training in automotives, construction technology, cosmetology, culinary arts, health sciences, information technology, multimedia, landscape & environmental design, precision machining, veterinary science, and welding.

A student must earn 28 credits to graduate, including: 4 credits in a mathematics sequence, 3 credits in science, including life and physical science, 4 credits in English, 3 credits in a social studies sequence, 1 credit in fine art, 1 credit in health and physical education, 1 credit in personal finance, and 4.5 elective credits. Elective courses can be in English, science, social studies, foreign language, technology and business, family and consumer science, and fine art. Students attending the career center follow the same basic requirements, but have requirements in career & technical education rather than fine arts. All students must pass Ohio state exams in English I & II, Algebra I, Geometry, Biology, American History, and American Government, or the like.

Athletics

OHSAA State Championships

 Boys basketball – 1947 
 Boys track and field – 1938

Conference titles
 Football – 1936, 1953, 1973, 1984, 1994, 1997, 2003, 2015, 2018
 Basketball – 2008**
 Baseball – 2009**
 Golf – 2015**
 * Tri-County League titles
 ** Inter-Tri County League titles

Media appearances
Columbiana High School was featured on TruTV's The Principal's Office. Additionally, a number of the school's sports games have aired live, including the 2005 Columbiana vs. Crestview football game, 2006 Columbiana vs. South Range football game, and 2008 Columbiana vs. McDonald basketball game on FOX 17/62 as games of the week. The 2018 football season opener vs Western Reserve aired on WFMJ in Youngstown.

Notable alumni
Harvey S. Firestone - businessman & founder of the Firestone Tire and Rubber Company

Notes and references

External links
 District Website

High schools in Columbiana County, Ohio
Public high schools in Ohio
High School